Paulius Grybauskas (born 2 June 1984 in Vilnius, Lithuania) is a Lithuanian retired football goalkeeper.

Honours

Club
Ekranas
Lithuanian League: 2005
Lithuanian Supercup: 2006
Oțelul Galați
UEFA Intertoto Cup: 2007
Neftchi Baku
Azerbaijan League: 2011–12

International
Lithuania
Baltic Cup: 2010

References

External links
Profile at otelul-galati.ro 

1984 births
Living people
Lithuanian footballers
Lithuania international footballers
Association football goalkeepers
Footballers from Vilnius
FC Vilnius players
FK Ekranas players
ASC Oțelul Galați players
Wigry Suwałki players
FC Shakhtyor Soligorsk players
Skonto FC players
FK Riteriai players
FK Sūduva Marijampolė players
A Lyga players
Liga I players
Azerbaijan Premier League players
Latvian Higher League players
Expatriate footballers in Romania
Lithuanian expatriate sportspeople in Romania
Expatriate footballers in Azerbaijan
Lithuanian expatriate sportspeople in Azerbaijan
Lithuanian expatriate sportspeople in Poland
Expatriate footballers in Belarus
Lithuanian expatriate sportspeople in Belarus
Expatriate footballers in Latvia
Lithuanian expatriate sportspeople in Latvia
Neftçi PFK players
Expatriate footballers in Poland